Chintamoni Dhoba (died 1300AD), was ruler of Dhalbhum region and established capital at Ambikanagar (now in Bankura). Chintamoni belonged to the Dhobi caste. The 'pai' or grain measure used in these parganas was for a long time called 'Chintamon pai'.
 
His rule was for shorter span and later, his kingdom was annexed by Jagannath Deb, a Rajput of Dhar Parmar clan from Rajasthan and his family ruled the area for 700 years.

See also
Dhalbhum
Ghatsila
Raja Jagannath Deb

References 

 
Rulers of Bengal
1300 deaths
People from West Bengal